Otto Gustave Albert Hackbarth (March 11, 1886 – July 24, 1967) was an American professional golfer and club maker who played in the early-to-mid 20th century.  His best performances in major golf championships were a T7 finish in the 1912 U.S. Open and a T9 showing in the 1919 PGA Championship. Hackbarth placed fourth in the 1913 Western Open and finished T4 in 1919.

Early life
Hackbarth was born on March 11, 1886, in Granville, Wisconsin, the son of Carl Friedrich Hackbarth (1837–1893) and Henrietta Sylvester Hackbarth (1854–1952). He came from a family of golfers—his three brothers, Herman, John, and Alfred were also golf professionals. His brother Herman served as the professional at Little Rock Country Club from 1907–56 and designed a number of courses in Arkansas. Among his three brothers Alfred had the best tournament results, posting a number of good U.S. Open finishes including an 11th-place result in 1921 when he shot a 69 in the final round at Columbia Country Club.

Golf career
In 1903, Hackbarth was playing out of Oconomowoc Country Club when he was a contestant in the Western Open in Milwaukee that year. He worked as a golf professional at the Hinsdale Golf Club in Chicago and also in St. Louis, Missouri, but his longest posting—from 1916 through 1951—was at Cincinnati Country Club. An expert club maker, he was known for his patented putter design called "the Hackbarth" that he created circa 1910.  The putter was hickory-shafted and had a forked hosel. One example of the collectible putter sold for a hammer price of $5,000 in a Sotheby's auction in 2007. The great amateur, Chick Evans, used the putter as did prolific tournament winner Arthur Bartlett from Iowa.

1912 U.S. Open
The 1912 U.S. Open was held August 1–2 at the Country Club of Buffalo in Amherst, New York, a suburb east of Buffalo. Hackbarth carded rounds of 77-77-75-76=305 and finished tied for seventh place with Jack Dowling. Both players won $45 in prize money. John McDermott won the tournament finishing two strokes ahead of runner-up Tom McNamara.

1919 PGA Championship
In the 1919 PGA Championship Hackbarth nearly upset eventual tournament winner Jim Barnes in the second round, losing by the slim margin of 3 and 2 after being 3 holes up after the first 18 holes of a 36-hole match play pairing. In the second 18-hole portion of the match Hackbarth experienced some difficulties.  At the 4th hole his approach shot landed in a bunker and he hit his next shot thin, launching the ball into another bunker on the other side of the green; he scored 6 losing the hole.  On the lengthy 9th hole Hackbarth battled back by laying a fine stymie and won the hole, Barnes being unable to hole a chip shot over the ball of Hackbarth which was blocking the hole.

The New York Times described the match as "the proverbial close shave". Hackbarth also played in the 1920 PGA Championship, losing in the first round.

PGA Seniors' Championship
Hackbarth won the 1940 PGA Seniors' Championship held at the North Shore Club in Sarasota, Florida, beating Jock Hutchison in a second 18-hole playoff. The players had tied on 74 in the first playoff and were required to play another 18 holes to determine the winner. In the second playoff, Hackbarth carded another 74 to Hutchison's 75. In 1938 Hackbarth finished second in the same event, losing in a playoff on that occasion to Fred McLeod.

Death and legacy
Hackbarth died on July 24, 1967, in Cincinnati, Ohio, aged 81. He was buried in Summit Cemetery in Summit, Wisconsin. In his Last Will and Testament he bequeathed $1,000 each to a number of friends and relatives but left others nothing at all. In the Will, he fully explained why each of those not receiving money were being left out. He said quite matter of factly, "they will understand".

In 2004, he was inducted into the Southern Ohio PGA Hall of Fame.

Results in major championships

Note: Hackbarth never played in the Masters Tournament or The Open Championship.

NYF = Tournament not yet founded
NT = No tournament
DNP = Did not play
? = Unknown

R64, R32, R16, QF, SF = Round in which player lost in PGA Championship match play
"T" indicates a tie for a place
Yellow background for top-10.

References

American male golfers
Golfers from Wisconsin
People from Granville, Wisconsin
1886 births
1967 deaths